Michael di Santo (born December 10, 1989) is an American rower. He competed in the men's eight event at the 2016 Summer Olympics.  He rowed collegiately at Harvard University.

An alumnus of the University of Oxford, di Santo raced and won the 2014, 2015, and 2017 Oxford-Cambridge Boat Race, the final one as president of Oxford University Boat Club.

References

External links
 

1989 births
Living people
American male rowers
Harvard Crimson rowers
Olympic rowers of the United States
Rowers at the 2016 Summer Olympics
Place of birth missing (living people)
Alumni of the University of Oxford